David Stuart may refer to:
 Dave Stuart (jazz impresario) (né David Ashford Stuart; 1910–1984), owner of the Jazz Man Record Shop in Hollywood
 David Stuart (actor) (born 1965), Canadian actor
 David Stuart (diplomat), Australian diplomat and member of the United Nations Commission on Sustainable Development
 David Stuart (fur trader) (1765–1853), fur trader who worked primarily for the North West and Pacific Fur companies
 David Stuart (major-general) (born 1772), Scottish highland soldier and later author
 David Stuart (Mayanist) (born 1965), professor of Maya language and civilization
 David Stuart (Michigan politician) (1816–1868), politician from the U.S. state of Michigan
 David Stuart (structural biologist) (born 1953), structural biologist and X-ray crystallographer of viruses
 David Stuart (Virginia politician) (1753–c. 1814), Virginia doctor, politician and correspondent of President George Washington

 David E. Stuart, American anthropologist and novelist
 Dave Stuart (born David Ashford Stuart, 1910–1984), owner of Jazz Man Records

See also
 David Stewart (disambiguation)
 Dave Stewart (disambiguation)